The Cingino Dam is a gravity masonry dam located  southwest of Antrona Schieranco, Province of Verbano-Cusio-Ossola in Piedmont, Italy. The dam creates Lago Cingino (or Cingino reservoir) which is fed by the Antigine and Troncone streams. It is one of five reservoirs within a hydroelectric complex in the Valle Antrona and helps supply the Campliccioli Power Plant with water for power production.

The dam became an internet sensation due to pictures of Alpine Ibex that climb up its steep downstream face in order to lick salt off the stones. A video shared by the BBC's Forces of Nature with Brian Cox has been viewed over 208 million times as of May 2022. Despite the picturesque setting, Atlas Obscura describes the dam as "otherwise unremarkable."

References 

Dams in Italy
Gravity dams
Dams completed in 1930
Masonry dams